St. Anthony of Padua is a Roman Catholic church at 427 Booth Street in Ottawa, Ontario, Canada, in the heart of Little Italy.

History
Founded in 1908 by Father Fortunatus Mizzi O.F.M. Cap., a Maltese priest, the first church was a small chapel, but burnt down in 1913. Another church, designed by Guido Nincheri, was erected in 1913 to replace it. This structure was completed in 1925, however it was severely damaged by a fire just four years later.  It was again rebuilt, this time with very little wood.

The church has long been the social centre of the Italian-Canadian community in Ottawa. Across the street is St. Anthony's School, a Catholic elementary school.  The church is also the base for the St. Anthony Italia Soccer Club, one of Ottawa's most competitive amateur soccer teams. In front of the church is Piazza Dante where major social events are held. The largest of these is Italian Week, which attracts several thousand people and occurs every June beginning with the Feast of St. Anthony.

References

Bibliography
"Little Italy. Ottawa's largest, best-known ethnic neighborhood thrives Series: In the neighborhood." Tony Lofaro. The Ottawa Citizen. Jun 6, 1988. pg. D.1.PEO
"Record crowd celebrates St. Anthony: Procession draws as many as 12,500." Matthew Sekeres. The Ottawa Citizen. Jun 11, 2001. pg. C.1.FRO

External links 
Parish Website
Founding a Community: The History of St. Anthony's Church

Roman Catholic churches in Ottawa
Burned buildings and structures in Canada
Italian diaspora in Canada